The Bassmaster Classic (known as the Academy Sports + Outdoors Bassmaster Classic for sponsorship) is a tournament in the sport of professional bass fishing. It was first held in 1971 on Lake Mead, Nevada. Originally it was a fall event, (1971-1983) but it switched to a summer event in 1984 and then to a late winter event in 2006.

The event has turned into a three-day spectacle, complete with a theatrical presentation of the weigh-ins and hours of television coverage on FS1 and FOX. The entire event is also streamed live on Bassmaster.com.

Rick Clunn and Kevin VanDam have each won the event four times. Jordan Lee, Bobby Murray, Hank Parker, George Cochran and Hank Cherry have each won twice.

First-place money has grown from $10,000 in 1971 to $500,000 in 2006; it was reduced to $300,000 in 2014.

Rules and procedures 
The field has ranged from 24 to 61 anglers. The 2009 competition included women for the first time. 2010 was the last year for women to be given a specific Classic spot. As in previous years, they now have to earn a spot via the Opens or, qualify for the Bassmaster Elite Series and have enough success to gain a spot to the Classic. The Bassmaster College Series, B.A.S.S. Nation and the Team Championship also offer paths to the Classic.

The Bassmaster Classic takes place over three days. All fish are caught under catch-and-release rules, must measure at least 12 inches (or as that state law requires), and must be alive at the time they are presented for weigh-in or a penalty will be assessed. There is a cut after the second day, in which only the 25 top anglers, based on total weight, advance to the third day. The highest total weight after three days wins the competition.

Contestants can only fish in specified areas at the competition venue. This is usually a lake, but the 1980 Classic was held on the Saint Lawrence River out of Alexandria Bay, NY, the 2005 competition was held at Three Rivers (Allegheny River and Monongahela River which forms the Ohio River) in Pittsburgh, with some competitors using tributaries such as the Beaver River and Youghiogheny River miles from the confluence.  In 2009 and 2012 the Classic used a 100-mile stretch of the Red River in Shreveport, Louisiana. In 2011, the Classic was held on the Louisiana Delta. The Classic venue continues to change from year to year, but tends to revisit prior Classic sites as well.

From its inception to 1976, the Classic was held at a "mystery lake," unknown to competitors until they were aboard an aircraft  bound for the site. Founder Ray Scott changed the practice for the 1977 Classic, announcing the site in advance so that fans of the sport could plan ahead to attend.

Past winners

Record Book 
 Largest Bass Caught: 11-10, Preston Clark, Toho, FL 2006
 Heaviest Venue Total Weight: 54-13, Red River, LA 2009
 Heaviest Total Weight: 75-9, Rick Clunn, Arkansas River, AR 1984
Lowest Total Winning Weight: 12-15. Kevin Van Dam, Three Rivers, PA 2005
 Heaviest Single Day Weight: 32-3, Paul Mueller, Guntersville, AL 2014
 Most Bassmaster Classic Wins: 4, Rick Clunn, 1976, 1977, 1984, 1990 / 4, Kevin VanDam, 2001, 2005, 2010, 2011
 Most Top 5 Classic Finishes: 11, Rick Clunn
 Most Consecutive Classic Appearances: 28, Rick Clunn, 1974-2001
 Most Second Place Finishes: 4, Aaron Martens, 2002, 2004, 2005, 2011
 Largest Final Day Comeback: 13-14 deficit, Jordan Lee, Conroe, TX 2017

References

External links 
 
 Bassmaster Classic 2008 Update Venue
 BASS official site
 About.com
 2007 Classic qualifiers
 2008 Classic update
 2008 Classic update
 2008 Classic update

Fishing tournaments
Professional sports leagues in the United States
1971 establishments in the United States
Recurring sporting events established in 1971